Mike Magario   (born November 18, 1991) is a Brazilian professional baseball outfielder, who is in the Tokyo Yakult Swallows organization. He attended Aomori Yamada High School and represented Brazil at  2013 World Baseball Classic.

References

External links
Baseball America

1991 births
2013 World Baseball Classic players
Brazilian expatriate baseball players in Japan
Brazilian people of Japanese descent
Living people
Sportspeople from Salvador, Bahia